Beached Az is an animated cartoon series broadcast by the Australian Broadcasting Corporation (ABC). It is shown on both ABC1 and ABC2.

Concept 
Beached Az follows the struggle of a whale beached on a New Zealand beach to get back into the ocean. During his time on the beach, the whale encounters a variety of sea life who discuss their various problems and ambitions. Each episode uniquely lacks any formal narrative arc, and the series is more a collection of comedic conversations highlighting social differences.

History 
Beached Az is a continuation of the characters developed in the short film titled "Beached Whale" which was created in April 2008. The short film was animated/directed by Jarod Green and written/directed by Anthony MacFarlane and Nick Boshier.

Appearing primarily on YouTube, the film gained widespread popularity in Australia and New Zealand through social media channels. In 2009, the same creators came together to write, direct and animate ten more episodes for ABC Television under the banner of their newly founded company The Handsomity Institute.

Writing for the series took place at Seal Rocks on the NSW coast whilst final recording took place in June at the ABC studios in Ultimo.

On 13 September 2009 the series debuted online one week before broadcast on ABC2. On 3 June 2010, season 2 premiered.

On 4 November 2010 Beached Az was launched into DVD format available nationally.

DVD release 
The complete "Beached Az" collection was released nationally on 4 November 2010. The DVD includes all 21 episodes from season one and two of the cartoon plus exclusive never before seen footage from the creators.

The DVD also includes pilot episodes of the 'failed Scottish children's TV show' "Breakfast with Bergerk".

Episodes

Season 1: 2009

Season 2: 2010

Season 3: 2019 
On 11 December 2018, Production House Robot Army Productions put up a video on Youtube announcing the "new home" of Beached Az, along with new episodes commissioned by The Government of Australia and Screen Australia. The planned release date for this new season was March, 2019. As in previous seasons, the humour is both comic and confrontational with episodes set to tackle issues such as coral bleaching, reverse racism, the impact of plastic and fishing on the ocean environment, genetic diversity of fish in fish farms, global warming, sexism, drug cartels and corporate deforestation.

References

External links 
 
Handsomity Institute website
 

2000s Australian animated television series
2010s Australian animated television series
2009 Australian television series debuts
2010 Australian television series endings
Australian children's animated comedy television series
Australian Broadcasting Corporation original programming